Tegenaria is a genus of fast-running funnel weavers that occupy much of the Northern Hemisphere except for Japan and Indonesia. It was first described by Pierre André Latreille in 1804, though many of its species have been moved elsewhere. The majority of these were moved to Eratigena, including the giant house spider (Eratigena atrica) and the hobo spider (Eratigena agrestis).

They can be difficult to identify because they resemble wolf spiders and other funnel-web spiders in their area, unless found in an area where they don't occur naturally. They live on sheet webs, usually stretching across the corner between two walls. They have eight eyes in two straight or almost straight rows.

Species
 it contains 106 species:

T. abchasica Charitonov, 1941 — Caucasus (Russia, Georgia)
T. achaea Brignoli, 1977 — Greece, Turkey
T. adomestica Guseinov, Marusik & Koponen, 2005 — Azerbaijan
T. africana Lucas, 1846 — Algeria
T. agnolettii Brignoli, 1978 — Turkey
T. alamto Zamani, Marusik & Malek-Hosseini, 2018 — Iran
T. angustipalpis Levy, 1996 — Greece, Israel
T. anhela Brignoli, 1972 — Turkey
T. animata Kratochvíl & Miller, 1940 — Serbia, Montenegro, Macedonia
T. annae Bolzern, Burckhardt & Hänggi, 2013 — Greece
T. annulata Kulczyński, 1913 — Bosnia-Hercegovina, Croatia, Serbia, Montenegro
T. argaeica Nosek, 1905 — Bulgaria, Turkey
T. ariadnae Brignoli, 1984 — Greece (Crete)
T. armigera Simon, 1873 — France (Corsica), Italy (Sardinia)
T. averni Brignoli, 1978 — Turkey
T. bayeri Kratochvíl, 1934 — Bosnia-Hercegovina, Serbia, Montenegro
T. bayrami Kaya, Kunt, Marusik & Uğurtaş, 2010 — Turkey
T. bosnica Kratochvíl & Miller, 1940 — Croatia, Bosnia-Hercegovina, Serbia, Montenegro
T. bozhkovi (Deltshev, 2008) — Bulgaria, Greece
T. campestris (C. L. Koch, 1834) — Europe to Azerbaijan
T. capolongoi Brignoli, 1977 — Italy
T. carensis Barrientos, 1981 — Spain
T. chebana Thorell, 1897 — Myanmar
T. chiricahuae Roth, 1968 — USA
T. chumachenkoi Kovblyuk & Ponomarev, 2008 — Russia (Europe, Caucasus), Georgia
T. circeoensis Bolzern, Burckhardt & Hänggi, 2013 — Italy
T. comnena Brignoli, 1978 — Turkey
T. comstocki Gajbe, 2004 — India
T. concolor Simon, 1873 — Syria
T. cottarellii Brignoli, 1978 — Turkey
T. croatica Bolzern, Burckhardt & Hänggi, 2013 — Croatia
T. daiamsanesis Kim, 1998 — Korea
T. dalmatica Kulczyński, 1906 — Mediterranean to Ukraine
T. decolorata Kratochvíl & Miller, 1940 — Croatia
T. dentifera Kulczyński, 1908 — Cyprus
T. domestica (Clerck, 1757) — Europe to China, Japan. Introduced to Australia, New Zealand, the Americas
T. eleonorae Brignoli, 1974 — Italy
T. elysii Brignoli, 1978 — Turkey
T. epacris Levy, 1996 — Israel
T. faniapollinis Brignoli, 1978 — Greece, Turkey
T. femoralis Simon, 1873 — France, Italy
T. ferruginea (Panzer, 1804) — Europe, Azores. Introduced to Venezuela
T. forestieroi Brignoli, 1978 — Turkey
T. halidi Guseinov, Marusik & Koponen, 2005 — Azerbaijan
T. hamid Brignoli, 1978 — Turkey
T. hasperi Chyzer, 1897 — France to Turkey, Russia (Europe)
T. hauseri Brignoli, 1979 — Greece
T. hemanginiae Reddy & Patel, 1992 — India
T. henroti Dresco, 1956 — Sardinia
T. ismaillensis Guseinov, Marusik & Koponen, 2005 — Azerbaijan
T. karaman Brignoli, 1978 — Turkey
T. lapicidinarum Spassky, 1934 — Ukraine, Russia (Europe)
T. lehtineni (Guseinov, Marusik & Koponen, 2005) — Azerbaijan
T. lenkoranica (Guseinov, Marusik & Koponen, 2005) — Azerbaijan, Iran
T. levantina Barrientos, 1981 — Spain
T. longimana Simon, 1898 — Turkey, Caucasus (Russia, Georgia)
T. lunakensis Tikader, 1964 — Nepal
T. lyncea Brignoli, 1978 — Turkey, Azerbaijan
T. maelfaiti Bosmans, 2011 — Greece
T. mamikonian Brignoli, 1978 — Turkey
T. maroccana Denis, 1956 — Morocco
T. maronita Simon, 1873 — Syria, Lebanon, Israel
T. mediterranea Levy, 1996 — Israel
T. melbae Brignoli, 1972 — Turkey
T. mercanturensis Bolzern & Hervé, 2010 — France
T. michae Brignoli, 1978 — Lebanon
T. mirifica Thaler, 1987 — Switzerland, Austria. Italy
T. montana Deltshev, 1993 — Bulgaria
T. montiszasensis Bolzern, Burckhardt & Hänggi, 2013 — Greece
T. nakhchivanica (Guseinov, Marusik & Koponen, 2005) — Azerbaijan
T. oribata Simon, 1916 — France
T. pagana C. L. Koch, 1840 — Europe to Central Asia. Introduced to USA, Mexico, Brazil, Chile
T. parietina (Fourcroy, 1785) — Europe, North Africa to Israel and Central Asia. Introduced to Jamaica, Paraguay, South Africa, Sri Lanka
T. parmenidis Brignoli, 1971 — Italy
T. parvula Thorell, 1875 — Italy, Romania
T. pasquinii Brignoli, 1978 — Turkey
T. percuriosa Brignoli, 1972 — Bulgaria, Turkey
T. pieperi Brignoli, 1979 — Greece (Crete)
T. pindosiensis Bolzern, Burckhardt & Hänggi, 2013 — Greece
T. podoprygorai (Kovblyuk, 2006) — Ukraine
T. pontica Charitonov, 1947 — Georgia
T. pseudolyncea (Guseinov, Marusik & Koponen, 2005) — Azerbaijan
T. racovitzai Simon, 1907 — Spain, France
T. ramblae Barrientos, 1978 — Portugal, Spain
T. regispyrrhi Brignoli, 1976 — Bulgaria, Greece, Balkans
T. rhodiensis Caporiacco, 1948 — Greece (Rhodes), Turkey
T. rilaensis Deltshev, 1993 — Macedonia, Bulgaria
T. sbordonii Brignoli, 1971 — Italy
T. schmalfussi Brignoli, 1976 — Greece (Crete)
T. schoenhoferi Bolzern, Burckhardt & Hänggi, 2013 — Greece
T. scopifera Barrientos, Ribera & Pons, 2002 — Spain (Balearic Is.)
T. serrana Barrientos & Sánchez-Corral, 2013 — Spain
T. shillongensis Barman, 1979 — India
T. silvestris L. Koch, 1872 — Europe
T. talyshica Guseinov, Marusik & Koponen, 2005 — Azerbaijan
T. taurica Charitonov, 1947 — Ukraine, Georgia
T. tekke Brignoli, 1978 — Turkey
T. tridentina L. Koch, 1872 — Europe
T. tyrrhenica Dalmas, 1922 — France, Italy
T. vallei Brignoli, 1972 — Libya
T. vanensis Danişman & Karanfil, 2015 — Turkey
T. vankeerorum Bolzern, Burckhardt & Hänggi, 2013 — Greece (Rhodes), Turkey
T. vignai Brignoli, 1978 — Turkey
T. wittmeri Brignoli, 1978 — Bhutan
T. zagatalensis Guseinov, Marusik & Koponen, 2005 — Azerbaijan
T. zamanii Marusik & Omelko, 2014 — Iran

References

External links

 
Araneomorphae genera
Cosmopolitan spiders